The Province of Hanover was a province of the Kingdom of Prussia and the Free State of Prussia from 1868 to 1946.

During the Austro-Prussian War, the Kingdom of Hanover had attempted to maintain a neutral position, along with some other member states of the German Confederation. After Hanover voted in favour of mobilising confederation troops against Prussia on 14 June 1866, Prussia saw this as a just cause for declaring war; the Kingdom of Hanover was soon dissolved and annexed by Prussia. The private wealth of the dethroned House of Hanover was then used by Otto von Bismarck to finance his continuing efforts against Ludwig II of Bavaria.

In 1946, the British military administration recreated the State of Hanover based on the former Kingdom of Hanover; but within the year, at the instigation of the German leadership, it was merged into the new state of Lower Saxony—along with the states of Oldenburg, Brunswick, and Schaumburg-Lippe—with the city of Hanover as the capital of this new state.

Hanoverian regions
 

Hanover was subdivided into six regions first called Landdrostei[en] (High-Bailiwick[s]), which were reorganised into Prussian standard Regierungsbezirke (governorates) on 1 April 1885.
Aurich
Osnabrück
Stade
Lüneburg (Lunenburg)
Hildesheim
Hanover

Administrative divisions from 1885 
On 1 April 1885 the six Landdrosteien were turned into regional administrative districts called Regierungsbezirke:

The Regierungsbezirke were subdivided into new urban and rural counties (Stadtkreise and Landkreise), the old Amt structure being disbanded. Where the name of the county town differs from that of the county, it is shown in brackets:

Regierungsbezirk Aurich

Stadtkreise
Emden
Wilhelmshaven (1919–1937, then ceded to Oldenburg)

Landkreise
Aurich 
Emden (to 1932, then divided between the town of Emden, Landkreis Norden and Landkreis Leer)
Leer
Norden
Weener (to 1932, then to Landkreis Leer)
Wittmund

Regierungsbezirk Hannover

Stadtkreise
Hamelin (from 1923)
Hanover
Linden (1886–1920, then to the city of Hanover)

Landkreise
Grafschaft Diepholz (county offices in Diepholz, to 1932 Kreis Diepholz)
Grafschaft Hoya (county offices in Syke, before 1932 Kreis Hoya)
Grafschaft Schaumburg (county offices in Rinteln, before 1932 Province of Hesse-Nassau)
Hameln-Pyrmont (county offices in Hamelin, before 1922 Kreis Hameln)
Hanover
Linden (to 1932, then to Landkreis Hannover)
Neustadt am Rübenberge
Nienburg/Weser
Springe
Stolzenau (to 1932, then to Landkreis Nienburg/Weser)
Sulingen (to 1932, then to Landkreis Grafschaft Diepholz)
Syke (to 1932, then to Landkreis Grafschaft Hoya)

Regierungsbezirk Hildesheim

Stadtkreise
Göttingen
Goslar (to 1941, then to Brunswick)
Hildesheim

Landkreise
Alfeld
Duderstadt
Einbeck
Göttingen
Goslar (to 1941, then to Brunswick)
Gronau
Hildesheim
Holzminden (from 1941, previously Brunswick)
Ilfeld (to 1932, then to Province of Saxony)
Marienburg i. Hann. (county offices in Hildesheim)
Münden 
Northeim
Osterode am Harz
Peine
Uslar (to 1932, then to Landkreis Northeim)
Zellerfeld (county offices in Clausthal-Zellerfeld)

Regierungsbezirk Lüneburg

Stadtkreise
Celle
Harburg (1927 to Harburg-Wilhelmsburg)
Harburg-Wilhelmsburg  (1927–1937, then to Hamburg)
Lüneburg
Wilhelmsburg (1925–1927, then to Harburg-Wilhelmsburg)

Landkreise
Bleckede (to 1932, then to Landkreis Lüneburg) 
Burgdorf
Celle
Fallingbostel
Gifhorn
Harburg (county offices in Hamburg-Harburg)
Isenhagen (to 1932, then to Landkreis Gifhorn) 
Lüchow-Dannenberg (county offices in Lüchow, formed in 1932 from the counties of Lüchow and Danneberg)
Lüneburg
Soltau
Uelzen (county offices to 1974 in Oldenstadt)
Winsen

Regierungsbezirk Osnabrück

Stadtkreise
Osnabrück

Landkreise
Aschendorf-Hümmling (county offices in Aschendorf/Ems, formed in 1932 from the counties of  Aschendorf and Hümmling)
Landkreis Bersenbrück
Grafschaft Bentheim (county offices in Bentheim)
Iburg (to 1932, then to Landkreis Osnabrück)
Lingen
Melle
Meppen
Osnabrück
Wittlage

Regierungsbezirk Stade

Stadtkreise
Cuxhaven (from 1937, previously part of Hamburg)
Geestemünde (1912–1924, then to Stadtkreis Wesermünde)
Lehe (1920–1924, then to Stadtkreis Wesermünde)
Wesermünde (formed in 1924 from the counties of Geestemünde and Lehe)

Landkreise
Achim (to 1932, then to Landkreis Verden)
Blumenthal (to 1932, then to Landkreis Osterholz)
Bremervörde
Hadeln (county offices in Otterndorf, 1932 to Landkreis Land Hadeln)
Jork (to 1932, then to counties of Stade and Harburg)
Kehdingen (to 1932, then to Landkreis Stade)
Land Hadeln (county offices in Otterndorf, formed in 1932 from the counties of Hadeln and Neuhaus an der Oste)
Neuhaus an der Oste (to 1932, then to Landkreis Land Hadeln)
Osterholz (county offices in Osterholz-Scharmbeck)
Rotenburg i. Hann.
Stade
Verden 
Wesermünde (formed in 1932 from the counties of Geestemünde and Lehe)
Zeven (to 1932, then to Landkreis Bremervörde)

Presidents of the Province of Hanover
The heads of the provinces, appointed by the central Prussian government, were called Oberpräsident (Upper President). The provincial executive, the Landesdirektor (provincial director), was elected by the provincial parliament (Provinziallandtag).

Otto Graf zu Stolberg-Wernigerode 1867–1873
Botho Wendt August Graf zu Eulenburg 1873–1878
Adolf Hilmar von Leipziger 1878–1888
Rudolf von Bennigsen 1888–1897
Konstantin Graf zu Stolberg-Wernigerode 1898–1902
Richard von Wentzel 1902–1914
Ludwig Hubert von Windheim 1914–1917
Ernst von Richter (DVP) 1917–1920
Gustav Noske (SPD) 1920–1933
Viktor Lutze (NSDAP) 1933–1941
Hartmann Lauterbacher (NSDAP) 1941–1945
Hinrich Wilhelm Kopf (SPD) 1946

See also 
 Kingdom of Hanover, for rulers of Hanover before the Prussian annexation

 
Provinces of Prussia
1868 establishments in Prussia
Province of Hanover
1946 disestablishments in Germany